This is a timeline documenting events and facts about stand-up comedy in the year 2015.

Events

 February 24: Comedy Dynamics announces that they have acquired late comedian's Bill Hicks’ estate and will be re-releasing his entire catalog of specials and albums.
 May 3: a larger-than-life sized statue of Richard Pryor is unveiled in the late comedian's hometown, Peoria. The statue was created by artist Preston Jackson, who named it Richard Pryor: More than Just a Comedian.
 May 19: Chelsea Peretti wins the Webby Award for Outstanding Comedic Performance for her Netflix special, One of the Greats.
 September 20: Louis C.K. wins the Primetime Emmy Award for Outstanding Writing for a Variety Special for his self-distributed special, Live at the Comedy Store.

Deaths

 February 19: Harris Wittels dies at the age of 30 in Los Angeles, from an accidental heroin overdose.

Releases

January

 January 2: Nick DiPaolo's one-hour special Another Senseless Killing is released on VHX. The special was filmed at the Acme Comedy Club in Minneapolis.
 January 16: Gary Owen's one-hour special I Agree with Myself is released on Showtime. The special was filmed at the Atlanta Civic Center in Atlanta.
 January 16: Ari Shaffir's one-hour special Paid Regular is released on Comedy Central. The special was filmed at The Comedy Store in Los Angeles.
 January 23: Kyle Kinane's one-hour special I Liked His Old Stuff Better is released on Comedy Central. The special was filmed at the 40 Watt Club in Athens.
 January 23: Iliza Shlesinger's one-hour special Freezing Hot is released on Netflix. The special was filmed at the Gothic Theatre in Englewood.
 January 27: Louis C.K.'s one-hour special Live at the Comedy Store is released on LouisCK.net. The special was filmed at The Comedy Store in Los Angeles.
 January 31: Mel Brooks's one-hour special Live at the Geffen is released on HBO. The special was filmed at the Geffen Playhouse in Los Angeles.

February

 February 5: Brian Gaar's one-hour special Jokes I Wrote at Work is released on Vimeo. The special was filmed at the Spider House in Austin.
 February 6: Matt Braunger's one-hour special Big Dumb Animal is released on Comedy Central. The special was filmed at The Bell House in New York.
 February 15: Andy Peters's one-hour special Exclamation Mark Question Point is released on Hulu. The special was filmed at The Virgil in Los Angeles.
 February 21: Keith Robinson's one-hour special Back of the Bus Funny is released on Comedy Central. The special was filmed at the Gramercy Theatre in New York.
 February 28: Ralphie May's one-hour special Unruly is released on Netflix. The special was filmed at the Cobb Energy Performing Arts Centre in Atlanta.

March

 March 6: Aziz Ansari's one-hour special Live at Madison Square Garden is released on Netflix. The special was filmed at the Madison Square Garden in New York.
 March 6: Trevor Moore's one-hour special High in Church is released on Comedy Central. The special was filmed at the Gramercy Theatre in New York.
 March 14: Jay Mohr's one-hour special Happy. And a Lot. is released on Showtime. The special was filmed at the Lobero Theatre in Santa Barbara.

April

 April 17: Chris D'Elia's one-hour special Incorrigible is released on Netflix. The special was filmed at The Wiltern in Los Angeles.
 April 17: Tig Notaro's stand-up tour documentary Knock Knock, It's Tig Notaro is released on Showtime.  The documentary was filmed across the country and Tig's hometown of Pass Christian, Mississippi.
 April 17: Barry Hilton's one-hour special The Live Series: Barry Hilton is released on M-Net. The special was filmed at the Lyric Theatre in Johannesburg.
 April 24: Jim Norton's one-hour special Contextually Inadequate is released on Epix. The special was filmed at the Somerville Theatre in Boston.
 April 27: Nate Bargatze's one-hour special Full Time Magic is released on Comedy Central. The special was filmed at the Gramercy Theatre in New York.
 April 29: Mick Foley's one-hour special Cheap Pops is released on WWE Network. The special was filmed at the Full Sail University in Winter Park.

May

 May 8: Brad Williams's one-hour special Fun Size is released on Showtime. The special was filmed at the Lobero Theatre in Santa Barbara.
 May 9: Christopher Titus's one-hour special The Angry Pursuit of Happiness is released on Comedy Central. The special was filmed at the Lobero Theatre in Santa Barbara.
 May 22: Jen Kirkman's one-hour special I'm Gonna Die Alone (And I Feel Fine) is released on Netflix. The special was filmed at The North Door in Austin.
 May 29: Jim Breuer's one-hour special Comic Frenzy is released on Epix. The special was filmed at the Paramount Theatre in New York.
 May 30: Nick Swardson's one-hour special Taste It is released on Comedy Central. The special was filmed at The Paramount Theatre in Austin.

June

 June 17: Susan Calman's one-hour special Lady Like is released on Go Faster Stripe. The special was filmed at the Citizens Theatre in Glasgow.
 June 26: Lisa Lampanelli's one-hour special Back to the Drawing Board is released on Epix. The special was filmed at the Tarrytown Music Hall in Greenburgh.

July

 July 10: Chris Tucker's one-hour special Chris Tucker Live is released on Netflix. The special was filmed at the Fox Theatre in Atlanta.
 July 11: Bridget Everett's one-hour special Gynecological Wonder is released on Comedy Central. The special was filmed at the Joe's Pub in New York.
 July 15: Eugene Mirman's one-hour special Vegan on His Way to the Complain Store is released on Netflix. The special was filmed at the Old Tucson Studios in Tucson.

August

 August 1: Jay Pharoah's one-hour special Can I Be Me? is released on Showtime. The special was filmed at The Cutting Room in New York.
 August 14: Demetri Martin's one-hour special Live (At the Time) is released on Netflix. The special was filmed at the Lincoln Theatre in Washington.
 August 15: Colin Quinn's one-hour special Unconstitutional is released on Netflix. The special was filmed at the Cherry Lane Theatre in New York.
 August 21: Maz Jobrani's one-hour special I'm Not a Terrorist, But I've Played One on TV is released on Showtime. The special was filmed at The Wiltern in Los Angeles.
 August 22: Natasha Leggero's one-hour special Live at Bimbo's is released on Comedy Central. The special was filmed at the Bimbo's 365 Club in San Francisco.
 August 22: Tig Notaro's one-hour special Boyish Girl Interrupted is released on HBO. The special was filmed at the Wilbur Theatre in Boston.

September

 September 5: Lil Rel Howery's one-hour special RELevent  is released on Comedy Central. The special was filmed at The Vic Theatre in Chicago.
 September 10: Craig Ferguson's one-hour special Just Being Honest is released on Epix. The special was filmed ae The Town Hall in New York.
 September 17: Jeff Dunham's one-hour special Unhinged in Hollywood is released on NBC. The special was filmed at the Hollywood and Highland Center in Los Angeles.
 September 19: Steve Rannazzisi's one-hour special Breaking Dad is released on Comedy Central. The special was filmed at the Wilbur Theatre in Boston.
 September 25: Margaret Cho's one-hour special PsyCHO is released on Showtime. The special was filmed at the Gramercy Theatre in New York.
 September 26: Brian Regan's one-hour special Live from Radio City Music Hall is released on Comedy Central. The special was filmed at the Radio City Music Hall in New York.

October

 October 1: Anjelah Johnson's one-hour special Not Fancy is released on Netflix. The special was filmed at the City National Grove of Anaheim in Anaheim.
 October 6: Jimmy Dore's one-hour special Sentenced to Live is released on Hulu. The special was filmed at the El Portal Theater in Los Angeles.
 October 10: Paul F. Tompkins's one-hour special Crying and Driving is released on Comedy Central. The special was filmed at the Palace Theatre in Los Angeles.
 October 16: Anthony Jeselnik's one-hour special Thoughts and Prayers is released on Netflix. The special was filmed at The Fillmore in San Francisco.
 October 17: Amy Schumer's one-hour special Live at the Apollo is released on HBO. The special was filmed at the Apollo Theater in New York.
 October 27: Sarah Colonna's one-hour special I Can't Feel My Legs is released on Hulu. The special was filmed at the El Portal Theater in Los Angeles.

November

 November 13: Bianca Del Rio's one-hour special Rolodex of Hate is released on Vimeo. The special was filmed at The Paramount Theatre in Austin.
 November 13: Miles Jupp's one-hour special Miles Jupp Is the Chap You're Thinking Of is released on Go Faster Stripe. The special was filmed at the Theatre Royal in Margate.
 November 13: John Mulaney's one-hour special The Comeback Kid is released on Netflix. The special was filmed at the Chicago Theatre in Chicago.
 November 15: John Bishop's one-hour special John Bishop Supersonic Live is released on BBC Worldwide. The special was filmed at the Royal Albert Hall in London.
 November 22: Trevor Noah's one-hour special Lost in Translation is released on Comedy Central. The special was filmed at the Lincoln Theatre in Washington.
 November 23: Dara Ó Briain's one-hour special Crowd Tickler is released by Universal Studios. The special was filmed at the Hammersmith Apollo in London.
 November 23: Kevin Bridges's one-hour special A Whole Different Story... is released by Universal Studios. The special was filmed at The SSE Hydro in Glasgow.

December

 December 1: Brent Morin's one-hour special I'm Brent Morin is released on Netflix. The special was filmed at the Gramercy Theatre in New York.
 December 4: Marc Maron's one-hour special More Later is released on Epix. The special was filmed at The Vic Theatre in Chicago.
 December 10: Elliott Morgan's one-hour special Premature is released on Vimeo. The special was filmed at the El Cid in Los Angeles.
 December 11: Jermaine Fowler's one-hour special Give'em Hell Kid is released on Showtime. The special was filmed at the DC Improv in Washington.
 December 14: Colleen Ballinger's one-hour special Miranda Sings: Selp Helf is released on Vimeo. The special was filmed at The Moore Theatre in Seattle.
 December 18: Mike Epps's one-hour special Don't Take It Personal is released on Netflix. The special was filmed at the Orpheum Theatre in Los Angeles.

See also
 List of stand-up comedians

References

2010s in comedy
Standup
Stand-up comedy